Arnold Silverstone, Baron Ashdown (28 September 1911 24 July 1977) was a British life peer.

Arnold Ashdown was a property developer and developed Ashdown House, on Victoria Street, London SW1. He was also involved with the Conservative Party under Edward Heath.

Having been knighted in 1964, Silverstone was created Baron Ashdown, of Chelwood in the County of East Sussex on 3 January 1975.

He was the brother of Lord Stone.

References

1911 births
1977 deaths
Life peers
Life peers created by Elizabeth II